The Feyzullah Mosque ("Mosque of Feyzullah") is a historical Ottoman-era mosque in the town of Arta, Epirus, Greece.

History 
The mosque was named after one Feyzullah, who was the mosque's donor. It is one of the two surviving mosques in Arta, the other being the Faik Pasha Mosque.

The time of its construction can not be determined, however, it is considered to have been built around the same time as the Mosque of Faik Pasha was, the first commander of Arta after the Turkish conquest, so it should be dated in the 15th century. This is further supported by the fact that Suleiman Mustafa, Faik Pasha's flag-bearer, was buried in the mosque.

During the hostilities in Epirus during the Greek-Turkish war of 1897, part of the mosque's minaret was destroyed; the rest of the minaret collapsed in 1917.

Until 1941, it belonged to the Ottoman Emin Bey. In 1962, the mosque was declared an archeological site.

Mosque 
This mosque, like most mosques in Greece and the rest of the Balkans, is of type A. It consists of a simple one-room prayer hall, with a square plan and side, measuring 6.40 m. It is located on Arachthou and Katsantoni street, a short distance from the church of Agia Theodora, the patron saint of the town of Arta.

See also 
 Islam in Greece
 List of mosques in Greece

References

External links 
 

Ottoman mosques in Greece
15th-century mosques
Buildings and structures in Arta, Greece
15th-century architecture in Greece
Former mosques in Greece
Ottoman Epirus
Mosque buildings with domes